Tilo is a village in the Logone Occidental region of Chad, of which the capital is Moundou. It is located approximately 19 km east-northeast of Moundou.

The chief headman of the village, Nandji Laokoua, was killed by the Armed Forces for a Federal Republic (FARF) in December 1996.

References 

Populated places in Chad